Songs from the Heart is a compilation album by Greek keyboardist and composer Yanni, released on the BMG label in 1999.

Track listing
Disc 1

Disc 2

References

External links
Official Website

Yanni albums
1999 compilation albums